

Men's Team Competition

Final standings

Women's Team Competition

Final standings

Men's Floor Exercise

Final standings
  Kevin Lytwyn: 13.00
  Matt Lubrick: 12.70
  Jayd Lukenchuk: 12.65
  Christian Nuttall: 12.65
  Danny Chambers: 12.60
  Luc Blanchet: 12.25
  Spencer Dear: 12.15
  Mattson Moore: 12.05

Men's Pommel Horse

Final standings
  Alexander Hoy: 12.45
  Gabriel Boucher: 12.35
  Anderson Loran: 12.10
  Mattson Moore: 12.00
  Aaron Boila: 12.00
  Jaroslav Hojka: 11.30
  Simon Porter: 11.00
  Maxime Simard: 11.00

Men's Rings

Final standings
  Jayd Lukenchuk: 13.35
  Kevin Lytwyn: 13.15
  Danny Chambers: 13.05
  Vincent Pelletier: 12.80
  Alexander Hoy: 12.15
  Simon Barbosa: 12.05
  Ian Galvan: 12.00
  Aaron Boila: 11.15

Men's Vault

Final standings
  Kevin Lytwyn: 13.3000
  Jayd Michal J. Lukenchuk: 13.000
  Liam James Hawkins: 12.900
  Trevor William Nagy: 12.850
  Danny Ron Chambers: 12.800
  Ian Mark Galvan: 12.750
  Francois Lansard: 12.750
  Matt Lubrick: 12.550

Men's Parallel Bars

Final standings
  Jayd Michal J. Lukencuk: 13.15
  Alexander Hoy: 12.95
  Kevin Lytwyn: 12.95
  Jackson Payne: 12.50
  Mattson Moore: 12.40
  Gregory Roe: 12.35
  Danny Chambers: 11.50
  Maxime Simard: 11.45

Men's Horizontal Bar

Final standings
  Spencer Dear: 13.15
  Kevin Lytwyn: 12.75
  Jackson Payne: 12.70
  Kyle Ryley: 12.55
  Jayd Lukenchuk: 12.40
  Anderson Loran: 12.30
  Jaroslav Hojka: 12.10
  Alexander Hoy: 11.60

Women's Floor Exercise

Final standings
  Alycia Chan: 15.00
  Amanda Fuller: 14.90
  Nicole Pineau: 14.45
  Alexandra Picton: 14.30
  Marion Potvin: 13.70
  Stephanie McGregor: 13.55
  Emmanuelle Harvey: 13.45
  Dominique Pegg: 13.15

Women's Vault

Final standings
  Dominique Pegg: 15.400
  Hannah Karina Swift: 15.200
  Alycia Maria Chan: 15.050
  Marion Potvin: 14.950
  Catherine Dion: 14.850
  Amanda Jaclyn Fuller: 14.850
  Megan Jennifer Halback: 14.600
  Jessica MacCallum: 13.900

Women's Uneven Bars

Final standings
  Brittany Rogers: 15.00
  Mélissa Corbo: 13.80
  Marion Potvin: 13.60
  Kim Genereux: 13.25
  Dominique Pegg: 12.90
  Melissa Clark: 12.50
  Alexandra Picton: 11.80
  Nicole Heikkila: 10.55

Women's Beam

Final standings
  Brittany Rogers: 15.30
  Kelsey Lang: 14.85
  Nicole Heikkila: 14.60
  Dominique Pegg: 14.55
  Alexandra Picton: 14.50
  Sarah Flett: 14.05
  Stéphanie Desjardins-Labelle: 13.65
  Catherine Dion: 12.60

Artistic Gymnastics
Artistic Gymnastics,Canada Games
Artistic Gymnastics,Canada Games,2007